Spook the Herd is the fourth studio album by British indie rock band Lanterns on the Lake. It was released on 21 February 2020 under Bella Union.

Critical reception
Spook the Herd was met with generally favourable reviews from critics. At Metacritic, which assigns a weighted average rating out of 100 to reviews from mainstream publications, this release received an average score of 79, based on 8 reviews.

The album was shortlisted for the Hyundai Mercury Prize 2020.

Track listing

References

2020 albums
Lanterns on the Lake albums
Bella Union albums